John S. Barnes Jr. is an American politician who served in the New Hampshire Senate for the 17th district, from 1992 to 1998 and again from 2000 to 2012. A member of the Republican Party, he previously served as a member of the New Hampshire House of Representatives from 1988 until 1992.

He won the New Hampshire primary for Vice President of the United States in 2008. The following year, he co-sponsored a bill which abolished the vice-presidential preference ballot. The bill passed both houses of the state legislature and took effect in 2012.

References

External links 
The New Hampshire Senate - Senator John S. Barnes, Jr. official government website
Project Vote Smart - Senator John Barnes, Jr. (NH) profile
Follow the Money - John S (Jack) Barnes Jr
2006 20042002 2000 1998 campaign contributions

Republican Party New Hampshire state senators
Republican Party members of the New Hampshire House of Representatives
1931 births
Living people